Breathe is an Indian crime drama thriller streaming television series. It premiered on Amazon Video on 26 January 2018. It is Amazon Prime Video’s second Indian original series after 2017's Inside Edge. The series stars R. Madhavan, Amit Sadh, Hrishikesh Joshi, Sapna Pabbi, Atharva Vishwakarma and Neena Kulkarni. The sequel series starring Abhishek Bachchan is called Breathe: Into the Shadows and debuted on July 10, 2020.

Plot
"Two desperate and driven men must engage in the ultimate cat and mouse game to save the one they love.A dying kid and endless killings.What might one do for the one they love"

Cast
 R. Madhavan as Denzel "Danny" Mascarenhas
 Amit Sadh as Senior Inspector Kabir Sawant
 Sapna Pabbi as Ria Ganguly
 Neena Kulkarni as Juliet Mascarenhas
 Atharva Vishwakarma as Joshua "Josh" Mascarenhas
 Hrishikesh Joshi as Junior Inspector Prakash Kamble
 Shriswara as Dr. Aruna Sharma
 Shrikant Yadav as Malwankar
 Urmila Kanitkar as Margaret Mascarenhas
 Madhura Naik as Shaina
 Kali Prasad Mukherjee as Shankar Patil
 Jayashree Venketaramanan as Anita
Anuj Sachdeva as Sameer

Episodes

Sequel 
A follow-up titled Breathe: Into the Shadows starring Amit Sadh, Abhishek Bachchan and Nithya Menen premiered on Amazon Prime Video on July 10, 2020.

Reception 
Writing in Hindustan Times Rohan Naahar states "Madhavan and Amazon have created the single weirdest show on TV right now, like an adaptation of one of Keigo Higashino’s least popular novels directed by an Anurag Kashyap minion."

References

External links
 

Amazon Prime Video original programming
Hindi-language web series
Tamil-language web series
Television shows set in Mumbai
Serial killers in television
Fictional portrayals of police departments in India
Indian crime drama television series
Thriller television series